Samuel Hazan (born 5 March 1983) is a Canadian-Israeli football player.

Biography

2005 Maccabiah Games 
Hazan was part of the Canadian team that played in its first Maccabiah Games.  He set the record and was the first-ever goalscorer for Canada at the 2005 Maccabiah Games in a 1–0 win over defending gold medal champions, Argentina. At the 2022 Maccabiah Games, he played for Canada in the Masters Men competition.

References

External links 
 Fanzine.co.il
 
 

1983 births
Canadian Soccer League (1998–present) players
Living people
Jewish Canadian sportspeople
Jewish Israeli sportspeople
Israeli footballers
Maccabi Netanya F.C. players
Maccabiah Games competitors for Canada
Maccabiah Games footballers
Competitors at the 2005 Maccabiah Games
York Region Shooters players
Canadian emigrants to Israel
Israeli Premier League players
Association football forwards